The Crotonoideae (crotonoids) are a  subfamily within the family Euphorbiaceae.

See also 
 Taxonomy of the Euphorbiaceae

References 

 
Rosid subfamilies